The 2022 Women's Super50 Cup, known for sponsorship reasons as the CG Insurance Super50 Cup, was a women's 50-over cricket competition played in the West Indies. It took place from 16 to 25 June, with 6 teams taking part and all matches taking place in Guyana. Barbados won their third title in a row, defeating Jamaica in the final. The tournament followed the 2022 Twenty20 Blaze.

Competition format
The six teams were divided into two groups of three, playing each other team in their group once. The top two in each group advanced to the semi-finals. The bottom team in each group played off in the 5th-place play-off. Matches were played using a one day format with 50 overs per side.

The groups worked on a points system with positions being based on the total points. Points were awarded as follows:

Win: 4 points 
Tie: 2 points 
Loss: 0 points.
Abandoned/No Result: 2 points.

Standings

Group A

Group B

Source: Windies Cricket

Fixtures
Source: Windies Cricket

Group A

Group B

Knockout stages

Semi-finals

5th-place play-off

Final

Statistics

Most runs

Source: Windies Cricket

Most wickets

Source: Windies Cricket

References

External links
 Series home at Windies Cricket

Women's Super50 Cup
2022 in West Indian cricket